Shumeh (also Romanized as Shūmeh, Shameh, Shāmeh, and Shommeh; also known as Showmen) is a village in Darmian Rural District, in the Central District of Darmian County, South Khorasan Province, Iran. At the 2006 census, its population was 39, in 9 families.

References 

Populated places in Darmian County